Palio is a 1932 Italian historical drama film directed by Alessandro Blasetti and starring Leda Gloria, Laura Nucci and Guido Celano. The film is set against the backdrop of the Palio di Siena during the Medieval era.

Cast
 Leda Gloria as Fiora 
 Laura Nucci as Liliana 
 Guido Celano as Zarre 
 Mario Ferrari as Bachicche 
 Mario Brizzolari as Dott. Turamini 
 Olga Capri as La Cicciona, innkeeper 
 Ugo Ceseri as Rancanino 
 Vasco Creti as Brandano 
 Mara Dussia as Vittoria de' Fortarrighi 
 Anita Farra as Beatrice 
 Umberto Sacripante as Saragiolo 
 Gino Viotti as Gano

References

Bibliography 
 Bondanella, Peter. A History of Italian Cinema. Bloomsbury Publishing, 2009.

External links 
 

1932 films
Italian historical drama films
Italian black-and-white films
1930s historical drama films
1930s Italian-language films
Films directed by Alessandro Blasetti
Films set in Siena
Films set in Italy
Films based on short fiction
Italian horse racing films
1932 drama films
1930s Italian films